Joseph McDermott (December 1878 – March 6, 1923), was an American actor of the silent era. He appeared in 76 films between 1912 and 1923. He died in Los Angeles, California by committing suicide.

Selected filmography

 The Forbidden Trail (1923)
 Perils of the Yukon (1922)
Barb Wire (1922)
 Brute Force (1914)
 The Battle at Elderbush Gulch (1913)
 All for Science (1913)
 The Detective's Stratagem (1913)
 The Stopped Clock (1913)
 So Runs the Way (1913)
 A Woman in the Ultimate (1913)
 The Mothering Heart (1913)
 Red Hicks Defies the World (1913)
 A Timely Interception (1913)
 Just Gold (1913)
 The Wanderer (1913)
 The House of Darkness (1913)
 The Lady and the Mouse (1913)
 A Misunderstood Boy (1913)
 The Left-Handed Man (1913)
 The Sheriff's Baby (1913)
 A Welcome Intruder (1913)
 Fate (1913)
 Near to Earth (1913)
 Broken Ways (1913)
 Love in an Apartment Hotel (1913)
 A Chance Deception (1913)
 Oil and Water (1913)
 A Misappropriated Turkey (1913)
 An Adventure in the Autumn Woods (1913)
 Pirate Gold (1913)
 The Telephone Girl and the Lady (1913)
 Three Friends (1913)
 The Yaqui Cur (1913)
 My Baby (1912)
 The Chief's Blanket (1912)
 Blind Love (1912)
 A Change of Spirit (1912)
 The Inner Circle (1912)
 The Transformation of Mike (1912)
 The Old Bookkeeper (1912)

References

External links

1878 births
1923 deaths
People from Dubuque, Iowa
American male film actors
American male silent film actors
Suicides in California
20th-century American male actors
1923 suicides